Sally Hepworth (born 1980) is a writer based in Melbourne, Australia. She is the author of seven books, most notably The Secrets of Midwives, a novel she published in 2015 and The Good Sister, which won the 2021 Adult crime novel Davitt Award. Hepworth and her works have been featured in media outlets that have included USA Today, The New York Times, and The Sydney Morning Herald.

Career
Hepworth worked in both event management and Human Resources prior to her career as a writer. While on maternity leave with her first child, Hepworth wrote Love Like the French, a novel about a British woman who goes to France after an accident leaves her husband in a coma. The character goes to France to see what the French could teach her about living. Hepworth was unable to finish the book immediately after her son Oscar was born, but the book was eventually published in Germany in 2014.

Hepworth released a second book, The Secrets of Midwives, that she wrote while pregnant with her second child. The book was released in 2015 and is a novel about three generations of midwives. Her research for the book came from her own questioning of midwives during check-ups and reading fiction and nonfiction books on the subject. KJ Dell'Antonia from The New York Times called it a "fast and fun read," with other reviews of the book coming by way of Publishers Weekly, The Sydney Morning Herald, and Kirkus Reviews.

Hepworth has continued to release a novel every year, including The Things We Keep in 2016, The Mother's Promise in 2017 and The Family Next Door in 2018. The Family Next Door was Hepworth's first novel set in her hometown of Melbourne, Australia, a trend she has continued in her 2019 novel The Mother-in-Law.

Bibliography

Personal life
Hepworth resides in Melbourne, Australia with her husband and three children, Oscar, Eloise and Clementine Rose.

References

External links
Sally Hepworth official website
Sally Hepworth author profile at Macmillan Publishers
Sally Hepworth author profile at Pan Macmillan Australia

Living people
Writers from Melbourne
Australian women novelists
21st-century Australian novelists
21st-century Australian women writers
1980 births